Flatpak, formerly known as xdg-app, is a utility for software deployment and package management for Linux. It is advertised as offering a sandbox environment in which users can run application software in isolation from the rest of the system.

Features
Applications using Flatpak need permissions to have access to resources such as Bluetooth, sound (with PulseAudio), network, and files. These permissions are configured by the maintainer of the Flatpak and can be added or removed by users on their system.

Another key feature of Flatpak is that it allows application developers to directly provide updates to users without going through distributions, and without having to package and test the application separately for each distribution.

Packages are added to it by both the Flathub administrators and the developers of the programs themselves (though the admins have stated their preference for developer-submitted apps). Although Flathub is the de facto source for applications packaged with Flatpak, it is possible to host a Flatpak repository that is independent of Flathub.

Flatpak runs in a sandbox (which provides a separate, ABI-stable version of all common system libraries), and that means that it will always use more space on the system than common native packages. However, this is not a concern as Flatpak uses OSTree as its backend which can deduplicate matching files. This means that the first install of a Flatpak application will always take up more space at first, but will be more efficient as the user installs more Flatpak packages.

Support
Theoretically, Flatpak apps can be installed on any existing and future Linux distribution, including those installed with the Windows Subsystem for Linux compatibility layer, so long as bubblewrap and OSTree are available.

It can also be used on Linux kernel-based systems like ChromeOS.

The Flatpak setup page hosts setup instructions to start using Flathub and Flatpak on a large number of Linux distributions.

See also

 AppImage
 Snap
 Zero Install
 List of Linux package management systems

References

Free software
Free software programmed in C
Freedesktop.org
Linux installation software
Linux package management-related software
Operating system technology
Software distribution
Virtualization software